HSwMS Valen (Va), (Swedish for "Whale") was the third Hajen-class submarine of the Swedish Navy.

Construction and career 
HSwMS Valen was launched on 21 April 1955 by Karlskronavarvet, Karlskrona and commissioned on 4 March 1957.  

She was decommissioned on 1 July 1980 and later sold to West Germany for stationary trials in 1984.

Gallery

References 

Hajen-class submarines
Ships built in Karlskrona
1955 ships